Marafivirus is a genus of viruses in the order Tymovirales, in the family Tymoviridae. Plants serve as natural hosts. There are 11 species in this genus.

Taxonomy
The genus contains the following species:
 Alfalfa virus F
 Bermuda grass etched-line virus
 Blackberry virus S
 Citrus sudden death-associated virus
 Grapevine asteroid mosaic associated virus
 Grapevine Syrah virus 1
 Maize rayado fino virus
 Nectarine marafivirus M
 Oat blue dwarf virus
 Olive latent virus 3
 Peach marafivirus D

Structure
Viruses in Marafivirus are non-enveloped, with icosahedral and isometric geometries, and T=3 symmetry. The diameter is around 30 nm. Genomes are linear, around 6-7kb in length.

Life cycle
Entry into the host cell is achieved by penetration into the host cell. Replication follows the positive stranded RNA virus replication model. Positive stranded RNA virus transcription is the method of transcription. The virus exits the host cell by monopartite non-tubule guided viral movement. Plants serve as the natural host. The virus is transmitted via a vector (leafhoppers). Transmission routes are vector and mechanical.

References

External links
 Viralzone: Marafivirus
 ICTV

Tymoviridae
Virus genera